= Joseco, Nevada =

- Ghost town
- Location within Nevada Location within the United States
- Coordinates: 37°30′07″N 114°13′45″W
- Country: United States
- State: Nevada
- County: Lincoln
- Elevation: 5,430 ft (1,655 m)

Joseco is an extinct town in Lincoln County, in the U.S. state of Nevada.

== History ==
A post office was in operation at Joseco from 1916 until 1943. Joseco is derived from "Joseph", so named after a Mormon leader.
